Sven Schwarz may refer to:
 Sven Schwarz (rower)
 Sven Schwarz (swimmer)